Tara Rigney (born 30 March 1999) is an Australian representative rower. She is twice an Australian national champion, a world championship medallist  and is a 2021 Tokyo Olympian who competed in the Australian women's double-scull.

Club and state rowing
Rigney was schooled at Loreto Kirribilli in Sydney where she took up rowing. Her senior club rowing has been from the Sydney University Boat Club.

Rigney's state representative debut for New South Wales came in 2019 when she was selected in the state women's youth VIII which raced and won the Bicentennial Cup at the Interstate Regatta.

In 2021 following a dominant performance at the New South Wales state titles, she was selected as the NSW senior women's sculling representative for the Interstate Regatta. She won that national title, the Nell Slatter trophy. At that same regatta she won an Australian Championship title in the double scull with Amanda Bateman and in a quad scull contesting the 2021 open women's quad title, she finished in second place.

International representative rowing
Rigney made her Australian representative debut in 2019 when she was picked for the World Rowing U23 Championships in Sarasota in a coxless pair. That crew finished in tenth place.

By the time of national team selections in 2021 for the delayed Tokyo Olympics, Rigney's strong performances at that year's Australian Championships saw her selected to join Amanda Bateman who had already qualified Australia's double scull boat class during the 2019 international representative season. Bateman & Rigney placed third in their heat, fifth in the semi-final and won the petite final for an overall seventh place finish at the Olympic regatta. They were coached by Ellen Randall.

In March 2022 Rigney was selected in the sculling squad of the broader Australian training team to prepare for the 2022 international season and the 2022 World Rowing Championships.  Racing as Australia's single scull entrant she won bronze at the World Rowing Cup II in Poznan and then took silver at the WRC III in Lucerne.  At the 2022 World Rowing Championships at Racize, she raced as Australia's representative single sculler. She qualified for the A final and raced to a third place and a bronze medal at the World Championships.

References

External links

1999 births
Living people
Australian female rowers
Olympic rowers of Australia
Rowers at the 2020 Summer Olympics
21st-century Australian women
World Rowing Championships medalists for Australia